German submarine U-364 was a Type VIIC U-boat of Nazi Germany's Kriegsmarine during World War II.

She carried out two patrols. She did not sink or damage any ships.

She was a member of five wolfpacks.

She was sunk by a British aircraft in the Bay of Biscay on 29 January 1944.

Design
German Type VIIC submarines were preceded by the shorter Type VIIB submarines. U-364 had a displacement of  when at the surface and  while submerged. She had two shafts and two  propellers.

U-364 was fitted with five  torpedo tubes (four fitted at the bow and one at the stern), fourteen torpedoes, one  SK C/35 naval gun, 220 rounds, and two twin  C/30 anti-aircraft guns. The boat had a complement of between forty-four and sixty.

Service history
The submarine was laid down on 12 February 1942 at the Flensburger Schiffsbau-Gesellschaft yard at Flensburg as yard number 483, launched on 21 January 1943 and commissioned on 3 May under the command of Oberleutnant zur See Paul-Heinrich Sass.

She served with the 5th U-boat Flotilla from 3 May 1943 and the 7th flotilla from 1 November.

First patrol
U-364s first patrol took her from Kiel in Germany to Marviken.

Second patrol and loss
Her second foray was from Marviken on 28 November 1943, through the gap between Iceland and the Faroe Islands and into the North Atlantic Ocean. On 29 January 1944, she was sunk by depth charges dropped by a British Handley Page Halifax of No. 502 Squadron RAF in the Bay of Biscay.

49 men died in the U-boat; there were no survivors.

Previously recorded fate
U-364 was originally noted as missing, also in the Bay of Biscay from 31 January 1944. No explanation has ever been offered.

In addition, she was reported as sunk on 30 January 1944 by a British Vickers Wellington of 172 Squadron in the Bay of Biscay. The aircraft was shot down.

Wolfpacks
U-364 took part in five wolfpacks, namely:
 Coronel 1 (14 – 17 December 1943)
 Sylt (18 – 23 December 1943)
 Rügen 1 (23 – 28 December 1943)
 Rügen 2 (28 December 1943 – 7 January 1944)
 Rügen (7 – 14 January 1944)

References

Bibliography

External links

German Type VIIC submarines
U-boats commissioned in 1943
U-boats sunk in 1944
U-boats sunk by British aircraft
U-boats sunk by depth charges
1943 ships
Ships built in Flensburg
Ships lost with all hands
World War II submarines of Germany
World War II shipwrecks in the Atlantic Ocean
Maritime incidents in January 1944